Aristogeitonia monophylla is a species of plant in the Picrodendraceae family. It is found in Kenya and Tanzania. It is threatened by habitat loss.

References

Picrodendraceae
Vulnerable plants
Taxonomy articles created by Polbot